Alfred Edward Ansell (1876 – 16 February 1941) was a Reform Party Member of Parliament in New Zealand.

Ansell was born in 1876 in Dunedin. He was elected to the Chalmers electorate in the 1928 general election, but was defeated in 1935.

In 1935, he was awarded the King George V Silver Jubilee Medal. He died unexpectedly on 16 February 1941.

References

1876 births
1941 deaths
Reform Party (New Zealand) MPs
New Zealand MPs for Dunedin electorates
Members of the New Zealand House of Representatives
Unsuccessful candidates in the 1935 New Zealand general election